Boguszowa  is a village in the administrative district of Gmina Chełmiec, within Nowy Sącz County, Lesser Poland Voivodeship, in southern Poland.

The village was first mentioned in 1384 as Bogusszowa.

References

Boguszowa